Danish jazz dates back to 1923 when Valdemar Eiberg formed a jazz orchestra and recorded what are thought to be the first Danish jazz records in August 1924 ("I've Got a Cross-Eyed Papa" and "In Bluebird Land"). However, jazz in Denmark is typically first dated to 1925, when bandleader Sam Wooding toured in Copenhagen with an orchestra. This was the first time most Danes had heard jazz music. Some prominent early Danish jazz musicians include Erik Tuxen who formed a jazz band and was later named conductor of the Danish Radio Symphony Orchestra; Bernhard Christensen, an art music composer who incorporated jazz elements into his pieces, and Sven Møller Kristensen, who was the lyricist for many of Bernhard Christensen's pieces and who wrote a book on jazz theory in Danish.

History

In the 1930s, jazz became quite popular in Denmark; major figures of the period include pianist Leo Mathisen, violinist Svend Asmussen, trombonist Peter Rasmussen, saxophonist Kai Ewans, bassist Niels Foss, and pianist/vibraphonist Kjeld Bonfils. Many of these musicians played in Valdemar Eiberg's band.

Jazz went underground in 1940 as a result of the Nazi occupation of Denmark when jazz was discouraged by the regime. Nevertheless, it continued to be performed and recorded, even more so as Danish musicians began to fill the void created by the lack of foreign players touring through the area. Musicians such as Eiberg, Bonfils and Asmussen (who played in a band together), along with Uffe Baadh, Bruno Henriksen and Bertel Skjoldborg continued to make jazz music as a form of political protest. Many singers, such as Freddy Albeck, Ingelise Rune, and Raquel Rastenni, found it necessary to escape to Sweden in the later years of the occupation.

Following World War II, Danish jazz musicians began to split into an older guard, which maintained the style of traditional New Orleans jazz, and newer musicians who favored the bebop style of Charlie Parker and Dizzy Gillespie that was emerging in America. The former were represented by musicians such as pianist Adrian Bentzon, trombonist Papa Bue, and  trumpeter Theis Jensen, while the latter included saxophonist Max Brüel, bassist Erik Moseholm, drummer Uffe Baadh and trumpeter Jørgen Ryg.

In the early 1960s, a club called the Jazzhus Montmartre opened in Copenhagen, which was intended to recreate the atmosphere of jazz clubs in Paris and New York City. It became a major venue for both Danish and American jazz musicians. Many American jazz players moved to Copenhagen from the 1950s when Stan Getz and Oscar Pettiford moved there. They were  followed by Dexter Gordon, Kenny Drew, and Ben Webster in the 1960s, and Duke Jordan, Horace Parlan, Ed Thigpen, Bob Rockwell, and Thad Jones (who became the leader of the DR Big Band in 1977) in subsequent decades. Kenny Drew formed a trio with Alex Riel and Niels-Henning Ørsted Pedersen which became a staple at Jazzhus Montmartre.

In the 1960s, Danish musicians began to explore free jazz with saxophonist John Tchicai as the most prominent proponent. In parallel, a more mainstream wing evolved, including saxophonist Jesper Thilo.

As rock music became more popular in the 1970s, jazz's popularity waned, but it continues to be supported in venues such as the Copenhagen Jazzhouse and the annual Copenhagen Jazz Festival. The organization JazzDanmark, funded by the Danish government, works to promote jazz in Denmark and Danish jazz abroad.

Musicians

Danish jazz musicians

 Thomas Agergaard, saxophonist
 Jacob Anderskov, pianist, composer, bandleader
 Svend Asmussen, violinist
 Søren Bebe, pianist
 Nikolaj Benson
 Thomas Blachman, drummer and composer
 Jesper Bodilsen bassist
 Jakob Bro, guitarist
 Jakob Høyer, drummer
 Papa Bue, trombonist and bandleader
 Christina von Bülow, saxophonist
 Anders Christensen bassist
 Thomas Clausen, pianist
 Carsten Dahl, pianist
 Christina Dahl, saxophonist
 Nils Bo Davidsen, bassist
 Jakob Dinesen, saxophonist
 Chris Minh Doky, bassist
 Niels Lan Doky, pianist
 Pierre Dørge, guitarist, bandleader and composer
 Jørgen Emborg, pianist and composer
 Mikkel Ploug, guitarist
 Jacob Fischer, guitarist
 Lennart Ginman, bassist and composer
 Ib Glindemann, bandleader 
 Lasse Gustavsen, saxophonist 
 Ole Kock Hansen, pianist
 Bent Jædig, saxophonist
 Jan Kaspersen, pianist, bandleader
 Benjamin Koppel, saxophonist
 Søren Kjærgaard, pianist, composer, bandleader
 Morten Lund, drummer
 Jesper Lundgaard bassist
 Fredrik Lundin, saxophonist
 Marilyn Mazur, percussionist
 Leo Mathisen, pianist
 Palle Mikkelborg, trumpeter and composer
 Erik Moseholm, bassist, bandleader and composer
 Nicolai Munch-Hansen, bassist
 Lars Møller, saxophonist
 Cæcilie Norby, vocalist
 Kresten Osgood, drummer
 Thomas Ovesen
 Stefan Pasborg, drummer
 Niels-Henning Ørsted Pedersen, bassist
 Hugo Rasmussen, bassist
 Simon Spang-Hanssen, saxophonist
 Ole Sterndorff, banjoista
 Niels Jørgen Steen, pianist, bandleader and composer
 Bo Stief bassist
 John Tchicai, saxophonist
 Jesper Thilo, saxophonist
 Simon Toldam, pianist, composer, bandleader
 Kasper Tranberg, trompetist
 Hans Ulrik, saxophonist
 Mads Vinding, bassist
 Jonas Westergaard, bassist
 Jens Winther, trompetist, composer, bandleader
 Jesper Zeuthen, saxophonist
 Katrine Madsen, vocalist

Bands
 DR Big Band
 Klüvers Big Band
 Papa Bue's Viking Jazz Band
 Ernie Wilkins Almost Big Band
 StoRMChaser
 Mames Babegenush

American expatriates
 Stan Getz, saxophone (1958 – 1961)
 Oscar Pettiford, double bass, cello (1958 – to his death in 1960)
 Kenny Drew, piano (1961 – his death in 1993)
 Dexter Gordon, saxophone (1962 – 1976)
 Ben Webster, saxophone (1964 – his death in 1973)
 Stuff Smith, violin (1965 – his death in 1967)
 Richard B. Boone, trombone (1970 – his death in 1999)
 Horace Parlan, piano (1972 – his death 2017)
 Ed Thigpen, drums (1974 – his death in 2010)
 Thad Jones, trumpet (1978 – 1984)
 Duke Jordan, piano (1978 – his death in 2006)
 Ernie Wilkins, saxophone (1979 – his death in 1999)
 Bob Rockwell, saxophone (1983 – present)
 Bobby Ricketts, saxophone (1981 – present)
 Doug Raney, guitar (1977 – his death in 2016)

Venues
 Jazzhus Montmartre, Copenhagen – Official website
 Copenhagen JazzHouse
 Paradise Jazz, 14 Magstræde, Copenhagen – Danish Jazz Venue of the Year 2010
 La Fontaine, Copenhagen
 Atlas, Aarhus – Official website

See also
 Music of Denmark
 Copenhagen Jazz Festival
 Aarhus Jazz Festival

Literature 
 Olav Harsløf, et.al.: "Jazz i Danmark - 1950-2010" Politikens Forlag (2006).  
 Christopher Washburne: "Jazz Re‐Bordered: Cultural Policy in Danish Jazz" in Jazz Perspectives (Volume 4, Issue 2, p. 121-155, 2010)

References

External links 
 Jakob Bækgaard : Contemporary Jazz in Denmark: Different Sounds, Different Scenes All about Jazz (6 January 6, 2009). retrieved 5 August 2014. A review of the jazz scene in Denmark.
 JazzDanmark